Gerhard Huber (born 20 January 1934) is an Austrian gymnast. He competed in eight events at the 1960 Summer Olympics.

References

1934 births
Living people
Austrian male artistic gymnasts
Olympic gymnasts of Austria
Gymnasts at the 1960 Summer Olympics
Sportspeople from Salzburg
20th-century Austrian people